Alampur Papanasi Temples are a group of twenty three Hindu temples dated between 9th- and 11th-century that have been relocated to the southwest of Alampur village in Telangana. This cluster of mostly ruined temples are co-located near the meeting point of Tungabhadra River and Krishna River at the border of Andhra Pradesh. They are about 1.5 kilometers from the Alampur Navabrahma Temples of the Shaivism tradition, but completed a few centuries later by the Rashtrakutas and later Chalukyas.

The Papanasi temples exhibit the Nagara architecture with a square plan. The Papanasisesvara temple is the largest of Papanasi group. It has a square plan, a phamsana superstructure with a brahmachchanda-griva sikhara, plain outer walls and rangamandapa inside. The temple is dedicated to dancing Shiva (Nataraja, Natesha).

Together with the Navabrahma temples, the Papanasi group were related to the Kalamukha and Pashupata sect of Shaivism. Additional temples in this region made the site a Shaktism pitha. All of these temples featured Vaishnavism themes and narrated Hindu texts in their arts. Together these formed the Brahmeshvara Sthana tirtha (Kshetra), and before their destruction in the 14th and 15th centuries during Delhi Sultanate invasions and associated Muslim-Hindu conflict, they wielded enormous influence in regional religious life. Some historic Hindu and Buddhist literature refers to this site near Kurnool as Srisaila or Sriparvata. According to David White, this site in 12th century also became linked with the Shaivism sect called Virasaiva or Lingayats.

The Papanasi temple group is not at the original location. They have been moved and restored from their ruins by the Archaeological Survey of India after 1980. They were threatened by the Srisailam hydroelectric project, but they were moved to higher grounds and a barrage built to protect them which has saved them from further damage. Excavations associated with this transplantation of the temples unearthed evidence of temple building rituals.


Location
The Alampur Navabrahma temples are located in the Telangana village of Alampur, at the confluence (sangam) of two major rivers, the Tungabhadra and Krishna.

Gallery

See also

Aihole
Pattadakal
Alampur Navabrahma Temples

References

External links
Ten Mahishasuramardani Icons from Alampur, M Radhakrishna Sharma
Doorframes on the Earliest Orissan Temples, Thomas Donaldson

Hindu temples in Mahbubnagar district
Indian architectural history
Shiva temples in Telangana
Hindu pilgrimage sites in India
Chalukya dynasty
Hindu temple architecture
Indian rock-cut architecture